Mr. Penny's Race Horse is a 1956 picture book written and illustrated by Marie Hall Ets. The book tells the story of a farmer, Mr. Penny, and his animals who wish to win first place prizes at a fair. The book was a recipient of a 1957 Caldecott Honor for its illustrations.

References

1956 children's books
American picture books
Caldecott Honor-winning works